Steve McLaren (born February 3, 1975) is a Canadian former professional ice hockey winger who played primarily as an enforcer and was a member of the St. Louis Blues in the National Hockey League.

He last played for the Springfield Falcons of the American Hockey League. Known for his physical style of play, McLaren was considered by many to be one of the toughest players in AHL history. McLaren fought and defeated some of the toughest men to play in the American Hockey League, many who went on to have substantial NHL careers. His brief career in the NHL spanned six games, but included a fight and win over Peter Worrell then of the Colorado Avalanche.

Career statistics

References

External links

1975 births
Canadian ice hockey left wingers
Chicago Blackhawks draft picks
Ice hockey people from Ontario
Indianapolis Ice players
Living people
North Bay Centennials players
Sportspeople from Owen Sound
Philadelphia Phantoms players
St. Louis Blues players
South Carolina Stingrays players
Springfield Falcons players
Worcester IceCats players